A University Affiliated Research Center (UARC) is a strategic United States Department of Defense (DoD) research center associated with a university. UARCs are formally established by the Under Secretary of Defense for Research and Engineering (USD(R&E)). UARCs were developed to ensure that essential engineering and technology capabilities of particular importance to the DoD are maintained. However, UARCs are allowed to compete for other science and technology work, except when it is prohibited by their contracts.

Background
These nonprofit organizations maintain essential research, development and engineering "core" capabilities; maintain long-term strategic relationships with their DoD sponsors; and operate in the public interest, free from real or perceived conflicts of interest. Collaboration with the educational and research resources available at their universities enhances each UARC’s ability to meet the needs of their sponsors.

University affiliated laboratories have been conducting research and development for the United States Navy since 1942, beginning with the creation of the Applied Physics Lab at Johns Hopkins. The most recent UARC, created in 2012, is the National Strategic Research Institute at the University of Nebraska, which is performing research for the United States Strategic Command.

Occasionally, the creation of UARCs have been controversial.  For example, in July 2004 the Navy proposed the University of Hawaii at Mānoa as a UARC. In response, some students and others protested with a six-day sit in at the campus administration building.

List of current centers
Current UARCs and their sponsors are:

Army
 University of Southern California: Institute for Creative Technologies
 Georgia Institute of Technology: Georgia Tech Research Institute
 University of California at Santa Barbara: Institute for Collaborative Biotechnologies
 Massachusetts Institute of Technology: Institute for Soldier Nanotechnologies

MDA
 Utah State University: Space Dynamics Laboratory

Navy
 Johns Hopkins University: Applied Physics Laboratory
 Pennsylvania State University: Applied Research Laboratory
 University of Texas at Austin: Applied Research Laboratories
 University of Washington: Applied Physics Laboratory
 University of Hawaii at Manoa: Applied Research Laboratory

OSD
 Stevens Institute of Technology: Systems Engineering Research Center
 University of Maryland, College Park: Applied Research Laboratory for Intelligence and Security
 University of Alaska Fairbanks: Geophysical Institute

USSTRATCOM
 University of Nebraska: National Strategic Research Institute

List of former centers 
Former UARCs and their sponsors are:

NASA
 University of California, Santa Cruz: UARC at Ames Research Center (2003 - 2016)

NSA
 University of Maryland, College Park: Center for Advanced Study of Language (2003 - 2018)

Notes

References 

United States Department of Defense
Research and development in the United States
Research organizations in the United States